is a Japanese pop rock band formed in 1985. Tube members Maeda and Haruhata have composed for other artists under the Pipeline Project alias. Since the group released most of its songs in April to July, the catchphrase originated "Summer comes with Tube".

Members
Nobuteru Maeda - vocals, lyrics, composition, leader
Michiya Haruhata - guitar, keyboard, composition, backing-vocals
Hideyuki Kakuno - bass, backing-vocals
Ryoji Matsumoto - drums, percussion, backing-vocals

Discography

Albums
 HEART OF SUMMER (1 July 1985)
 OFF SHORE DREAMIN'  (1 December 1985)
 THE SEASON IN THE SUN (1 June 1986)
 BOYS ON THE BEACH (1 December 1986)
 Summer Dream (21 May 1987)
 Twilight Swim (21 November 1987)
 Beach Time (21 May 1988)
 Remember Me (21 December 1988)
 SUMMER CITY (21 June 1989)
 TUBEst (21 December 1989)
 N A T S U (15 June 1990) (21 June 1990)- The first print had a bandanna attached
 Shonan (25 May 1991) (29 May 1991) - The first print had a special packaging and a booklet
 Smile (15 April 1992)
 Noryo (10 June 1992)
 Say Hello (21 April 1993)
 Roman no Natsu (13 June 1992)
 Owaranai Natsu ni (15 June 1994) (18 June 1994) - The first print had a metal tube container and five postcards
 Melodies & Memories (16 November 1994) - The first print had a white packaging
 Yuzurenai Natsu (14 June 1995) (17 June 1995) - The first print had a metal tube container and five postcards
 TUBEst II (1 April 1996)
 Only Good Summer (10 June 1996) - The first print had a 3D printed packaging and a calendar with dates of TUBE's tours
 Bravo! (1 July 1997) - The first print had a portable phone strap in blue, green, pink, and yellow and also a postcard for a chance to see an outdoor concert
 HEAT WAVER (1 July 1998) - The first print had a portable phone strap and a postcard for a chance to see an outdoor concert
 Blue Reef (9 June 1999) (12 June 1999) - The first print had an original design T-shirt
 TUBEstIII (13 May 2000) - The first print had a special white packaging
 LANI KAI (20 July 2000)
 Soul Surfin' Crew (11 July 2001)
 Melodies & Memories II (21 November 2001)
 good day sunshine (31 July 2002)
 OASIS (16 July 2003)
 Natsu Geshiki (22 July 2004)
 TUBE (20 July 2005)
 B☆B☆Q (12 July 2006)
 WINTER LETTER (12 December 2007)
 Paradiso (16 July 2008)
 Blue Splash (8 July 2009)
 Surprise! (7 July 2010)
 Re-Creation (20 July 2011)
 Summer Addiction (27 June 2012)
 Your Tube + My Tube (17 June 2015)
 Best Of Tubest ~ all time best ~ (15 July 2015)
 Sunny Day (7 June 2017)

Singles
 "Bestseller summer" (1 June 1985)
 "Senchimentaru ni Kubittake" (21 October 1985)
 "Season in the Sun" (21 April 1986)
 "Because I love you" (5 September 1986)
 "Summer Dream" (10 April 1987)
 "Dance with you" (26 August 1987)
 "Beach Time" (30 April 1988)
 "Remember Me" (1 December 1988)
 "Summer City" (1 June 1989)
 "Stories" (1 December 1989)
 "Ah Natsuyasumi" (21 May 1990)
 "Shonan My love" (2 May 1991)
 "Sayonara yesterday" (1 July 1991)
 "Natsu dane" (2 May 1992)
 "Garasu no Memories" (21 May 1992)
 "Natsu wo Machikirenakute" (12 May 1993)
 "Datte Natsu janai" (1 July 1993)
 "Natsu wo Dakishimete" (11 May 1994)
 "Koi shite Mucho" (1 July 1994)
 "Melodies & Memories" (15 October 1994)
 "Yuzurenai Natsu" (26 April 1995)
 "Ano Natsu wo Sagashite" (8 July 1995)
 "Only you Kimi to Natsu no Hi wo" (10 May 1996)
 "Jonetsu" (21 May 1997)
 "Purity -Pyuati-" (8 August 1997)
 "-Junjo-" (22 April 1998)
 "-Hanabi-" (3 June 1998)
 "Surely Somewhere" (5 August 1998)
 "Himawari" (21 April 1999)
 "Yheei!" (4 August 1999)
 "In my Dream" (20 October 1999)
 "Truth of Time" (12 April 2000)
 "Niji ni Naritai" (28 June 2000)
 "Tsuki to Taiyō" (9 May 2001)
 "Hatsukoi" (27 June 2001)
 "Moeru Kemuru Monamuru" (4 July 2001)
 "I'm in love you, good day sunshine" (12 June 2002)
 "Kaze ni Yureru Tomorrow" (10 July 2002)
 "Aoi Merody" (16 April 2003)
 "Let's go to the sea -OASIS-" (2 July 2003)
 "Gekko" (22 October 2003)
 "Propose" (28 January 2004)
 "Natsumatsuri/Namida wo nijini" (30 June 2004)
 "Miracle Game" (8 December 2004)
 "SKY HIGH" (1 June 2005)
 "Ding!Dong!Dang!" (10 August 2005)
 "Minna no Umi" (21 June 2006)
 "Hotaru" (30 April 2008)
 "Paradiso -Ai no Meikyū-" (25 June 2008)
 "Summer Greeting" (10 June 2009)
 "Shakunetsu Love" (2 June 2010)
 "Sora to Umi ga aruyouni (8 December 2010)
 "A Day In The Summer ～Omoudehaegaonomama～ (6 July 2011)
 "Touch Happy" (22 August 2011)
 "Itsumo, Itsumademo" (9 May 2012)
 "imasara surfside" (8 April 2015)
 Summer Time (1 June 2015)
 Tonight (7 October 2015)
 Toudai (16 December 2015)
 Ride on Summer (6 July 2016)
 Natsu ga Kuru! (25 July 2018)

References

External links
 TUBE : Official website
 Tube Sony official website

TUBE
Sony Music Entertainment Japan artists
Musical groups from Kanagawa Prefecture
Musical groups established in 1985
Being Inc. artists